is a Japanese director and storyboard artist best known for co-directing Hidamari Sketch with Akiyuki Shinbo.

Career
Kamitsubo began his career in the anime industry as a photographer and episode director with studios Gonzo and Studio Deen. In 2004, he worked under Akiyuki Shinbo on the original anime series Magical Girl Lyrical Nanoha, and the following year was brought into Shaft by Shinbo the following year, where his first project with the company was as an episode director on Tsukuyomi: Moon Phase. He would later make his series directorial debut with Shinbo and Shaft in 2007 with Hidamari Sketch. Soon after, he left the company and began working on various Xebec projects, including his own series Softenni and Hen Semi. In 2012, however, he announced that he would be leaving the industry, and his final work would be as an episode director on the tenth episode of To Love Ru: Darkness under the pseudonym . Despite this, Kamitsubo returned to the industry in 2014, acting as a storyboard artist for Xebec's series Argevollen beginning with the 13th episode. Since 2017, Kamitsubo has mainly worked on series produced by Doga Kobo.

Works

Television series
 Highlights roles with series directorial duties.

OVAs

Notes

References

External links

Japanese animators
Japanese animated film directors
Anime directors
Living people
Year of birth missing (living people)
Place of birth missing (living people)